Benazir Bhutto Shaheed University: Lyari Karachi (BBSUL) is a Public Degree Awarding Institution located at Lyari town, Karachi, Pakistan. It was established in 2010.

Facilities like Gymnasium for sports, Auditorium for functions, Computer Labs, Library, Mosque, Canteen, Courtyard, etc. will be available.

Initially, the university has been set up at Government Boys Degree College, Lyari.

Faculties and Departments 
Department of Business Administration
Department of Computer Science
Department of Information technology
Department of Commerce
Department of English
Department of Education
Department of Pharmacy
Department of Economics
Department of Pharmacy

See also
 Shaheed Benazir Bhutto University of Veterinary & Animal Sciences in Sakrand, Sindh
 Shaheed Benazir Bhutto University (Sheringal) in Dir, Khyber Pakhtunkhwa
 Shaheed Benazir Bhutto University (Shaheed Benazirabad) in Shaheed Benazirabad, Sindh
 Shaheed Benazir Bhutto Women University, previously known as the Frontier Women University, in Peshawar, Khyber Pakhtunkhwa
 Shaheed Mohtarma Benazir Bhutto Medical University in Larkana, Sindh
 Medical Colleges
 Mohtarma Benazir Bhutto Shaheed Medical College
 Shaheed Benazir Bhutto Medical College
 Law Colleges
Shaheed Benazir Bhutto Law College

References

External links 

Universities and colleges in Karachi
Public universities and colleges in Sindh
Educational institutions established in 2010
2010 establishments in Pakistan
Memorials to Benazir Bhutto